Tyler Ford (born June 8, 1985) is an American professional basketball referee in the National Basketball Association (NBA), wearing number 39. As of the 2020-21 NBA season Ford has officiated 333 regular-season games and 15 playoff games. He is in his seventh season as an NBA referee.

Early life
Ford was born on June 8, 1985, in Lima, Ohio. He graduated from Allen East High School in Lafayette, Ohio.

Officiating career
Ford officiated Division I college basketball for four seasons. Working games for the Big Ten Conference, Mid-American Conference and the Summit League. He also spent four seasons officiating the Women's National Basketball Association (WNBA). Before Ford joined the NBA officiating staff, he officiated five seasons in the NBA G League, where he worked the 2014 NBA G League All-Star Game and the 2015 NBA G League Finals. As of the 2020-21 NBA season Ford has officiated 333 regular-season games and 15 playoff games. He is in his seventh season as an NBA referee.

Personal life
Ford resides in Westfield, Indiana. From 2009 to 2015 Ford worked as the assistant director of Intramural Sports at Purdue University. He has a bachelor's and master's degree in Sport Administration from Ball State University.

References

External links
National Basketball Referees Association bio

1985 births
Living people
Basketball people from Indiana
Basketball people from Ohio
Sportspeople from Indiana
Sportspeople from Lima, Ohio
People from Westfield, Indiana
Ball State University alumni
College men's basketball referees in the United States
National Basketball Association referees
NBA G League referees